Ellis Avenue Historic District is a national historic district located at Orangeburg, Orangeburg County, South Carolina. The district encompasses eight contributing buildings in a residential section of Orangeburg. They include seven residences dated to the turn of the 20th century, and a two-story brick school building (1931).  The houses are in a variety of popular architectural styles including Victorian and Colonial Revival.

It was added to the National Register of Historic Places in 1985.

References

Houses on the National Register of Historic Places in South Carolina
Historic districts on the National Register of Historic Places in South Carolina
Victorian architecture in South Carolina
Colonial Revival architecture in South Carolina
Houses in Orangeburg County, South Carolina
National Register of Historic Places in Orangeburg County, South Carolina